"My Wife and My Mother-in-Law" is a famous ambiguous image, which can be perceived either as a young girl or an old woman (the "wife" and the "mother-in-law", respectively).

History

American cartoonist William Ely Hill (1887–1962) published "My Wife and My Mother-in-Law" in Puck, an American humour magazine, on 6 November 1915, with the caption "They are both in this picture — Find them". However, the oldest known form of this image is an 1888 German postcard.

In 1930 Edwin Boring introduced the figure to psychologists in a paper titled "A new ambiguous figure", and it has since appeared in textbooks and experimental studies.

References

See also

 Reversible figure

Optical illusions